Crossobamon orientalis, commonly called the Sind gecko, is a species of gecko, a lizard in the family Gekkonidae. The species is endemic to South Asia.

Geographic range
C. orientalis is found in Pakistan (Sindh: Rohri and Shikarpur Districts) and India (Rajasthan: Jaisalmer district).

Type locality: "Rohri and Shikarpur District, Upper Sind".

References

Further reading
Blanford WT (1876). "On some lizards from Sind, with descriptions of new species of Ptyodactylus, Stenodactylus, and Trapelus ". Proc. Asiatic Soc. Bengal 45: 232–233. (Stenodactylus orientalis, new species, pp. 232–233).
Boulenger GA (1885). Catalogue of the Lizards in the British Museum (Natural History). Second Edition. Volume I. Geckonidæ, Eublepharidæ, Uroplatidæ, Pygopodidæ, Agamidæ. London: Trustees of the British Museum (Natural History). (Taylor and Francis, printers). xii + 436 pp. + Plates I-XXXII. (Stenodactylus orientalis, pp. 16–17 + Plate III, figures 1, 1a).
Boulenger GA (1890). The Fauna of British India, Including Ceylon and Burma. Reptilia and Batrachia. London: Secretary of State for India in Council. (Taylor and Francis, printers). xviii + 541 pp. (Stenodactylus orientalis, pp. 57–58, Figures 21a & 21b).
Das I (2002). A Photographic Guide to Snakes and other Reptiles of India. Sanibel Island, Florida: Ralph Curtis Books. 144 pp. . (Crossobamon orientalis, p. 89).
Smith MA (1935). The Fauna of British India, Including Ceylon and Burma. Reptilia and Amphibia. Vol. II.—Sauria. London: Secretary of State for India in Council. (Taylor and Francis, printers). xiii + 440 pp. + Plate I + 2 maps. (Stenodactylus orientalis, pp. 33–34, Figures 13a & 13b).

External links

Reptiles of Pakistan
Geckos
or
Reptiles described in 1876